The Middlesex County Courthouse in Urbanna, Virginia was built starting in 1745.  It was listed on the National Register of Historic Places (NRHP) in 1976.  It has also been known as Old Middlesex County Courthouse and as Middlesex County Woman's Club.

During the American Civil War, the building was used by Confederate troops and was shelled by Union gunboats, but was not much damaged.  It has been used as a church.  In 1948 it was deconsecrated and ownership was transferred to the Middlesex County Woman's Club.  As of 1976 the building was used by that group as its headquarters and for community and private functions.  It is located in the Urbanna Historic District.

See also
Middlesex County Courthouse (Saluda, Virginia), a successor courthouse built in 1858, also NRHP-listed

References

Courthouses on the National Register of Historic Places in Virginia
Buildings and structures in Middlesex County, Virginia
County courthouses in Virginia
Colonial architecture in Virginia
Government buildings completed in 1745
Women's club buildings
Women in Virginia
National Register of Historic Places in Middlesex County, Virginia
Individually listed contributing properties to historic districts on the National Register in Virginia
1745 establishments in Virginia
History of women in Virginia